Graceful Inheritance is the debut album by an American metal band Heir Apparent, released in 1986 by French label Black Dragon Records. It was originally a vinyl-only release. Black Dragon re-released "Graceful Inheritance" on CD in October 1986, making it the first CD released by an independent label in Europe.

Track listing

Personnel 

 Paul Davidson – vocals
 Terry Gorle – guitar and vocals
 Derek Peace – bass
 Raymond Black – drums

Other 

 Eric Larnoy – cover
 Tom Hall – producing

External links
 Album information at discogs.com

1986 debut albums
Heir Apparent (band) albums